A Polyvector field within Mathematics topology is concerned with the properties of a geometric object. A multivector field, polyvector field of degree k , or  k-vector field, on a manifold , is a generalization of the notion of a vector field on a manifold. 

Just as the smooth sections of the tangent bundle (vector fields) make up a vector space, the space of smooth k-vector fields over M make up a vector space . 

Furthermore, since the tangent bundle is dual to the cotangent bundle, multivector fields of degree k are dual to k-forms, and both are subsumed in the general concept of a tensor field, which is a section of some tensor bundle, often consisting of exterior powers of the tangent and cotangent bundles. A (k,0)-tensor field is a differential k-form, a (0,1)-tensor field is a vector field, and a (0,k)-tensor field is k-vector field. While differential forms are widely studied as such in differential geometry and differential topology, multivector fields are often encountered as tensor fields of type (0,k), except in the context of the geometric algebra (see also Clifford algebra).

See also
 Multivector
 Blade (geometry)

References

Differential topology